Iván Bulos Guerrero (born 20 May 1993, in Lima, Perú) is former Peruvian footballer who last played as a forward at Carlos Stein.

Club career

Bulos started his career at the Regatas Lima youth team. In 2010, he was very close to sign with Club Atlético Banfield and Alianza Lima though he moved to Sporting Cristal. He played his first professional match in the Peruvian Primera División on July 30, 2012, a loss against FBC Melgar, substituting Tarek Carranza on minute 88. On 11 July 2015, he joined in O'Higgins starting on the 2015–16 season. On 9 July 2019, he rejoined Boavista after previously being on loan.

On 17 February 2020, Bulos returned to Peru and joined Sport Boys on a deal until June 2020. However, in the beginning of March 2020, it was confirmed that Bulos suffered from osteochondritis dissecans and was set to be out for 6–8 months, which would prevent him from playing for the rest of 2020. Also, his contract was to expire in June 2020. Bulos had similar injuries in his time in both Portugal and Croatia. Bulos ended his career after fifth knee operation to protect his health.

International career
He played for the Peru national under-20 football team at the 2013 South American Youth Championship. He scored in his first match, a tie against Chile on April 11, 2012.

References

External links

1993 births
Living people
Footballers from Lima
Association football forwards
Peruvian footballers
Peruvian expatriate footballers
Peru international footballers
Peruvian Primera División players
Sporting Cristal footballers
Sint-Truidense V.V. players
Deportivo Municipal footballers
O'Higgins F.C. footballers
Boavista F.C. players
HNK Hajduk Split players
Sport Boys footballers
FC Carlos Stein players
Challenger Pro League players
Chilean Primera División players
Primeira Liga players
Croatian Football League players
Peruvian expatriate sportspeople in Chile
Peruvian expatriate sportspeople in Belgium
Peruvian expatriate sportspeople in Portugal
Peruvian expatriate sportspeople in Croatia
Expatriate footballers in Chile
Expatriate footballers in Belgium
Expatriate footballers in Portugal
Expatriate footballers in Croatia
Peruvian people of Croatian descent